The Necropolis can refer to:
Glasgow Necropolis, Scotland
Kremlin Wall Necropolis, Moscow, Russia
Rookwood Cemetery, Sydney, Australia
Toronto Necropolis cemetery, Toronto, Canada
Episode 1, map 3 (E1M3) of the computer game Quake

See also
Necropolis